St George's College is a private, bilingual, co-educational learning institution located in Quilmes, province of Buenos Aires, Argentina. Founded in 1898, it is among the most exclusive and upper-class schools in Argentina, and indeed in Latin America. St George's College is the first boarding school established in Latin America. Originally an all-boys school, St. George's College was made co-educational in 1975.

In the First and Second World Wars, Old Georgians (OGs) volunteered and many were killed. The names of the deceased are displayed in the College's Chapel.

History

In 1895 the Rev. J T Stevenson, an Anglican priest born in South Africa and educated there and at St Augustine's College, Canterbury, was invited to go as chaplain to All Saints’ Church, Quilmes, where "there resided 2000 adherents of the Anglican Church, and where there was scope for development."

Many years later he wrote that the information then supplied was erroneous. On arrival he found that there were 200 Anglicans attached to All Saints’ and that there was little scope for development. Consequently, he intended to return to England, but since there existed the possibility of raising money to start a school and since a lady in Quilmes owned a property known as Quinta Rooke which she wished to lease or sell, Canon Stevenson approached the Bishop's Council for permission. Despite some hesitancy the Quinta Rooke estate was leased for two years with the option of purchase either during or at the end of that period for £5,000, and before the time expired it was bought, due to the generosity of many people and firms. The approximate area was 72,000 square metres, and the building consisted of a large rambling one-storey house, a small cottage and stable accommodation. The Headmaster's family, the boys, the matron and maids lived in the house, while the assistant masters occupied the upstairs of the cottage and the servants the downstairs of the same.

The motto chosen was Vestigia Nulla Retrorsum taken from the fable of the Fox and the Lion as told by the poet Horace: "Quia me vestigia terrent, / Omnia te adversum spectantia / Nulla retrorsum", says the Fox to the Lion who invited him into his den. "I am afraid of those footsteps; every track leads to your home but never a one leads back." The words stand for the principles of integrity, truth, the fear of God and true religion, which the Founders of St George's and their successors have endeavoured to uphold and inculcate.

The Founders had agreed to open the School provided 20 boys, all of whom had to be boarders, were enrolled; but actually St George's opened in 1898 with only six pupils. This was made possible because the Headmaster, who was still Chaplain of Quilmes, gave his services free and the Founders agreed to cover any deficit from their own pockets.

Progress was slow at first, but more rapid later. From time to time further land was purchased and buildings erected and enlarged. In 1901 the first edition of the school magazine, The Georgian, was published and in 1908 the Old Georgian Club was formed. There are now more than 1500 members. The first Old Georgian Dinner was held in 1910, and in the same year the Sanatorium was built. The pavilion, which still stands, was erected in 1911 to celebrate the coronation of King George V. On Founders’ Day in 1913 the foundation stone of the College chapel was laid. A cylinder was placed beneath the stone containing current copies of the "Buenos Aires Herald", "La Nación", the "Diocesan Magazine","The Georgian", the"College Prospectus" and "The Standard", as well as examples of various coins of the day. The Classroom Block was opened in April 1919 and in 1923 rugby was first played in the College. In July 1925, Mr Tschiffely, the PE instructor, started his famous 10,000 mile ride on horseback from Buenos Aires to New York. In March 1928 the Library Block, built over the old swimming pool, was opened, and the new swimming pool was inaugurated.

On August 10, 1929 the Preparatory School was opened and in March 1935 Canon Stevenson retired. In his farewell speech to the Old Georgians he said: "I take this opportunity to remind you that it is not what a man gets but what a man is that counts: he should first think of his character and then of his condition, for he that has character need have no fears about his condition, as character will draw after it, condition. Risk, then, everything for that, as your greatest capital in life is your character."

Canon Jackson, another long-serving Headmaster said in 1942: "Some of us think of schools as cramming institutions; others as a useful way of preparing our children to earn a living. A true school is neither; it is a place where a boy must learn to go straight for the truth, whatever he may be at. Parents send their children to us because they want an education which will provide these principles and which will prepare them to play their part in the life, culture and commerce of the Spanish-speaking Republic of which they are loyal citizens. We regard St George's College as a preparation for a boy who is going to continue his education in the universities of this country, the USA and Great Britain."

Canon Jackson was a man of vision. He saw that the College would have to build a Junior School to house between 70 and 100 boys by March 1945, that in addition a building with five classrooms for Junior School boys and an extra room for College boys would be necessary as well as two new laboratories, a museum and photographic rooms. But he was planning in 1943, during a war the results of which no one could yet appreciate, and not many of the new improvements could be achieved. The new Junior School, however, was just ready for the boys’ return in March 1945.

Times were hard after the war, and the Great Fire of July 1959 was a crippling blow. Had the boys been in residence, the fire would have never gained such a hold, for someone would have seen smoke or flames, but it was the first Sunday of the July holidays and no one noticed it. The whole of the original building and its contents was a total loss.

The situation was critical but Canon Jackson's leadership and a tremendous effort enabled St George's to open at the end of the holiday. The gymnasium became a dormitory and in the end 89 boys were able to sleep in the College. In the meantime, plans were drawn up to replace the lost buildings. A new Dining Hall and Kitchen block for 350 boys was begun early in 1960 and was occupied by March 1961. The new Lockwood Building to house 56 boys, took longer to complete because of lack of funds. It was at the inauguration of the new Dining Block after Speech Day 1960, that Canon Jackson made known his intention of retiring. He had spent 30 years at St George's.

Structure

Headmaster
The current Headmaster of St George's College is Ian Tate. He was born and educated in Leicestershire, England. He attended Loughborough College from 1974 to 1977, obtaining a Bachelor of Education degree from Loughborough University in 1978. His specialist subjects are Mathematics and Physical Education. He was awarded his Master of Arts degree from Bath University in 2007, specialising in Educational Management.

He first taught in Hertfordshire before moving to Markham College, Lima, Perú, then to St George's College, Quilmes, Argentina. He was appointed Head of St George's College North in July 2000 and has returned to Quilmes as the Headmaster in February 2016.

He is currently the Chair of the English Speaking Scholastic Association of the River Plate (ESSARP). He was the Chair of the Latin American Heads Conference (LAHC) from 2003 to 2007 and the Chair of the International Baccalaureate Diploma Committee from 2004 to 2007. He is currently an executive committee member of the English Speaking Union (ESU), Argentina.

He is also an International member of the Headmasters' and Headmistresses' Conference (HMC).

Academics
St George's College is a competitive School as an entrance examination has to be taken to enter Form One. The College follows the Cambridge International Examinations syllabi at "O" level and "A" level.

The House system
The school has a collegiate (house) system which consists of four houses at Primary and Secondary school which are identified by colour. At the Primary School the Houses are: Haxell - white and dark blue; Jackson - red and dark blue; Roberts - white and red; and Stevenson - all-white. At the secondary school, the houses are: Cutts House - black and yellow; Lockwood House - dark red and ocean blue; Farran House - yellow and sky blue; and Agar House - sky blue and white. Every student belongs to a house, and there is a housemaster who is assisted by other members of Faculty and the House Captains. Each boy inherits the house of his previous relatives and new students are allocated to a house on a random basis. The names of the Houses are obtained from founding fathers who played an instrumental role in establishing and developing the school, such as Mr Lockwood, the first Rector.

Sports
School's main sports are rugby union and women's field hockey. Apart from those activities, St. George's also hosts association football, athletics, basketball, cricket, golf, swimming, tennis, handball and volleyball.

On April 28, 1908, headmaster of St. George's college Joseph Stevenson, and sixteen alumni established Old Georgian Club. The rugby team entered the River Plate Rugby Union Championship (current Argentine Rugby Union) in 1935, winning the 1937, 1938 and 1939 championships. In 1978 the club withdrew from the Union. Currently the institution focuses on cricket, football, regatta, golf and tennis.

Notable Old Georgians

Alumni
Alumni of the school, known as Old Georgians, include Rhodes Scholars who attended Oxford, Cambridge, and Ivy League universities in the United States. In 1921, the Old Georgians Association was formed.
Peter Prescott (barrister)              
Sir Robert Malpas (born 1927), engineer and industrialist 
Sir Alasdair Neil Primrose, 4th Baronet (1935–1986), schoolmaster 
Nicolas Aguzin, CEO of Hong Kong Exchanges and Clearing Limited

Masters
Aimé Félix Tschiffely (1895–1954) writer and adventurer, taught at the school in the 1920s

See also

Old Georgian Club

References

External links
St. George College Quilmes 
St. George College North 
Fundación Educacional San Jorge 
Old Georgian Club 

Educational institutions established in 1898
International schools in Greater Buenos Aires
Secondary schools in Argentina
Cambridge schools in Argentina
Cricket grounds in Argentina
1898 establishments in Argentina